Houdini Live 2005: A Live History of Gluttony and Lust is an album by the Melvins, which was released in 2006 through Ipecac Recordings. It is a live rendition of their 1993 album Houdini.

Background and recording
In 2005, the Melvins were invited to play Houdini in its entirety by All Tomorrow's Parties for their Don't Look Back series. After performing, the band thought it would make for a good live album, but they had not recorded their set. Consequently, the band then rented an empty warehouse and played the set to an invitation-only crowd. The band played and recorded two sets, picking the best performances from each for the final album.

Track listing
"Pearl Bomb" (Melvins) – 1:39
"Hooch" (Melvins) – 2:33
"Night Goat" (Melvins) – 7:36
"Lizzy" (Melvins) – 4:49
"Goin' Blind" (Simmons/Coronel) – 4:34
"Cop-Ache" (Melvins) – 1:54
"Set Me Straight" (Melvins) / "Deserted Cities of the Heart" (Bruce/Brown) – 2:51
"Sky Pup" (Melvins) – 3:17
"Teet" (Melvins) – 2:45
"Joan of Arc" (Melvins) – 4:19
"Honey Bucket" (Melvins) – 2:21
"Hag Me" (Melvins) – 8:05
"Spread Eagle Beagle" (Melvins) – 12:30

Personnel
King Buzzo – guitar, vocals, extra percussion (track 13), liner notes
Dale Crover – drums, vocals
Trevor Dunn – bass guitar, vocals, extra percussion (track 13)
with
Lustmord –  extra percussion (track 13)

Additional personnel
Toshi Kasai– engineer
Edmundo Gomez– assistant engineer
Paul Barros Bessone– assistant engineer
Mackie Osborne– design

References

Melvins live albums
2006 live albums
Ipecac Recordings live albums